Kainantu Urban LLG is a local-level government (LLG) of Eastern Highlands Province, Papua New Guinea. Ukarumpa, an important SIL International base in Papua New Guinea, is located in the LLG.

Wards
81. Kainantu Urban
82. Aiyura Urban
83. Ukarumpa S.I.L.
84. Yonki Township

References

Local-level governments of Eastern Highlands Province